The Dhan Galli Bridge in Kashmir was constructed as part of redevelopment/resettlement in the general area affected by the Mangla Dam project.  The Mangla Dam is the world's seventh largest dam.

See also
Rathoa Haryam Bridge, another (incomplete) bridge across the Mangla Dam reservoir

Bridges in Pakistan